Pavel Yevgenyevich Shakuro (born 25 July 1997) is a Russian football player who plays for FC Akron Tolyatti.

Club career
He made his debut in the Russian Football National League for FC Tyumen on 30 August 2015 in a game against FC Zenit-2 St. Petersburg.

On 21 June 2019 he signed with Russian Premier League club PFC Sochi. He made his Russian Premier League debut for Sochi on 10 November 2019 in a game against PFC CSKA Moscow, substituting Elmir Nabiullin in the 60th minute. On 30 July 2020, he joined FC Irtysh Omsk on loan for the 2020–21 season.

Career statistics

References

External links
 
 Profile by Russian Football National League

1997 births
People from Tyumen
Sportspeople from Tyumen Oblast
Living people
Russian footballers
Association football defenders
Russia under-21 international footballers
FC Tyumen players
PFC Sochi players
FC Irtysh Omsk players
FC Yenisey Krasnoyarsk players
FC Akron Tolyatti players
Russian Premier League players
Russian First League players